Ironsides is an iron-hulled Thames barge which was built in 1900 for APCM. She was registered in London. A 60 hp auxiliary engine was fitted in 1939.

Description

History
Ironsides was built by Clarke & Stanfield, Grays, Essex in 1900 for the Associated Portland Cement and carried stone from Portland to London under sail alone. In 1928 she was sold to the London and Rochester Trading Company, who with 120 barges were the second largest barge owner in the country.

Currently (2018) Ironsides is based in Faversham off the Swale estuary. She does passenger charters along the Thames Estuary and the London River from Aldeburgh in Suffolk to Whitstable on the North Kent Coast. She sails from Maldon, Pin Mill, Chatham and London.

See also

List of active Thames sailing barges

References

Bibliography

External links

 Thames Sailing Barge Trust
 Mersea museum barge database
 Sailing Barge Association
 Society for Sailing Barge Research active barges

Ironsides
1900 ships
Individual sailing vessels
Ships built on the River Thames
Transport on the River Thames
Sailing ships of the United Kingdom
Ships and vessels of the National Historic Fleet